"Red Light Special" is a song by American vocal girl group TLC for their second studio album, CrazySexyCool (1994). Written and produced by Babyface, LaFace and Arista Records released the song as the second single from the album on February 21, 1995. The song found chart success, reaching number one on the US Billboard Rhythmic Top 40 chart and number two on the Billboard Hot 100 chart.

Critical reception
Steve Baltin from Cash Box felt the song "lives up to its name as one of the sultriest, sexiest singles to come along in years. Slow and entrancing, “Red Light Special” has definitely got the groove going on. A smash." Dave Sholin from the Gavin Report remarked that in numerous markets, this has been in heavy rotation for weeks. He also viewed it as "another example of why Babyface is the hottest writer/producer in the business. Flawless." Caroline Sullivan from The Guardian wrote that here, TLC "turn on the sweetness in inverse proportion to the raunchiness of the tune", adding that the song "which uses old blues imagery to express steamy lust, is superficially one of the prettiest numbers [on the album]." 

In his weekly UK chart commentary, James Masterton found that here, TLC are "slipping into a distinctly American summer groove to make what is arguably one of their best records ever and surpasses at a stroke the No.22 peak of "Creep" back in January." Ralph Tee from Music Weeks RM Dance Update stated, "The follow-up to 'Creep' is this beat ballad from the album. The pace of this genre of music is getting so slow now that if it's not careful it'll soon grind to a halt. Gerald Hall provides a mix that beefs up the rhythms a little to generate marginal dancefloor potential but the tune still needs a few rewinds to get into it." Charles Aaron from Spin commented, "Sexy, sexier, sexiest. If you liked 'em better when they were more like cartoons, you should wise up."

Music video
Shot in December 1994, the accompanying music video for "Red Light Special" was directed by Matthew Rolston and is set in a brothel. Male actors portray prostitutes and Left Eye plays a pimp while Chilli and T-Boz portray customers playing strip poker. A young Boris Kodjoe is featured as one of the male prostitutes. T-Boz is seen being caressed by a man in a room. Chilli is seen dancing with the guitar player. There are also black and white solo shots of the girls singing.

There are three versions of the music video. Version one is labelled "Sexy", the second is labelled "Sexier" and the final version is labelled "Sexiest". As a result of more sexually suggestive and racy footage being used in versions two and three, the first version is widely broadcast.

B-side: "My Secret Enemy"

The "Red Light Special" single contains a B-side rap track titled "My Secret Enemy", led by group rapper Lisa "Left Eye" Lopes, who wrote the track alongside Steve Keitt and R.A.S. Posse. Despite not making TLC's album CrazySexyCool, the song is highly praised by long-time TLC fans and kept up with the group's more matured style. Its lyrical content focuses on Lisa's coverage in the media and her relationship with Andre Rison. Lopes went on to say that the song came out directly after the incident that saw her accidentally set fire to Rison's Atlanta mansion. "It happened right after that incident and I was feeling like I needed a way out," said Lopes of the track.

Track listings

 US 7-inch and cassette singleA. "Red Light Special" – 5:02
B. "Red Light Special" (instrumental) – 5:02

 US 12-inch singleA1. "Red Light Special" (L.A.'s Flava mix extended version) – 6:02
A2. "Red Light Special" (album version) – 5:02
A3. "Red Light Special" (Gerald Hall's remix) – 5:09
B1. "Red Light Special" (acapella version) – 5:40
B2. "Red Light Special" (instrumental) – 5:02
B3. "My Secret Enemy" – 5:34

 US and Australian CD single "Red Light Special" (radio edit) – 4:40
 "Red Light Special" (L.A.'s Flava mix) – 4:28
 "Red Light Special" (album version) – 5:02
 "Red Light Special" (Gerald's Hall remix) – 5:09
 "My Secret Enemy" – 5:34

 US maxi-cassette single "Red Light Special" (radio edit)
 "Red Light Special" (L.A.'s Flava mix)
 "Red Light Special" (L.A.'s Flava mix extended version)
 "Red Light Special" (Gerald Hall's remix)
 "My Secret Enemy"

 UK CD single "Red Light Special" (radio edit) – 4:40
 "Red Light Special" (L.A.'s Flava mix) – 4:28
 "Red Light Special" (Gerald's Hall remix) – 5:09
 "My Secret Enemy" – 5:34

 UK 12-inch singleA1. "Red Light Special" (L.A.'s Flava mix extended version) – 6:02
A2. "Red Light Special" (album version) – 5:02
A3. "Red Light Special" (Gerald's Hall remix) – 5:09
B1. "Red Light Special" (acapella) – 5:40
B2. "Red Light Special" (instrumental) – 5:02

 UK cassette single and European CD single "Red Light Special" (radio edit) – 4:40
 "My Secret Enemy" – 5:34

 Japanese CD single'
 "Red Light Special" (radio edit)
 "Red Light Special" (L.A.'s Flava mix)
 "Creep" (Jermaine's Jeep mix)
 "My Secret Enemy"

Charts and certifications

Weekly charts

Year-end charts

Certifications

References

1995 singles
Music videos directed by Matthew Rolston
TLC (group) songs
Contemporary R&B ballads
Soul ballads
Songs written by Babyface (musician)
Song recordings produced by Babyface (musician)
Pop ballads
LaFace Records singles
Arista Records singles
1990s ballads